Redtown is an unincorporated community in Angelina County, in the U.S. state of Texas. According to the Handbook of Texas, the community had a population of 50 in 2000. It is located within the Lufkin, Texas micropolitan area.

History
The area in what is now known as Redtown today was first settled around 1900. A post office was established at Redtown in 1906 and was only in operation for a year and went by the name "Red". The community had two churches and a store in the mid-1930s. Many residents left Redtown since then, but there were still two churches, along with a cemetery, in the community in the early 1990s. Its population was 50 in 2000.

Geography

Education
Redtown had its own school in the mid-1930s. Today, the community is served by the Central Independent School District.

References

Unincorporated communities in Texas
Unincorporated communities in Angelina County, Texas